Hervey Libbert (1901–1953) was an American art director. He was employed by Tiffany Pictures in the late silent and early sound era on films such as Lucky Boy and Peacock Alley.

Selected filmography
 The Mystic (1925)
 The House of Scandal (1928)
 The Man in Hobbles (1928)
 Ladies of the Night Club (1928)
 Painted Faces (1929)
 Lucky Boy (1929)
 Mister Antonio (1929)
 The Lost Zeppelin (1929)
 Journey's End (1930)
 Peacock Alley (1930)
 Kathleen Mavourneen (1930)

References

Bibliography 
 Ankerich, Michael G. Mae Murray: The Girl with the Bee-Stung Lips. University Press of Kentucky,  2012.
 Bradley, Edwin M. Unsung Hollywood Musicals of the Golden Era: 50 Overlooked Films and Their Stars, 1929-1939. McFarland, 2016.

External links 
 

1901 births
1953 deaths
American art directors
People from Indiana